The Roman Catholic Diocese of Afogados da Ingazeira is a diocese located in the city of Afogados da Ingazeira in the Ecclesiastical province of Olinda e Recife in Brazil.

History
 July 2, 1956: Established as Diocese of Afogados da Ingazeira from the Diocese of Pesqueira

Leadership
 Bishops of Afogados da Ingazeira (Latin Rite)
 João José da Mota e Albuquerque (4 Jan 1957  – 28 Feb 1961), appointed Bishop of Sobral, Ceara
 Francisco Austregésilo de Mesquita Filho (25 May 1961  – 13 Jun 2001)
 Luis Gonzaga Silva Pepeu, O.F.M. Cap. (13 Jun 2001 –  11 Jun 2008), appointed Archbishop of Vitória da Conquista, Bahia
Egidio Bisol (7 Oct 2009 - present)

References
 GCatholic.org
 Catholic Hierarchy

Roman Catholic dioceses in Brazil
Christian organizations established in 1956
Afogados da Ingazeira, Roman Catholic Diocese of
Roman Catholic dioceses and prelatures established in the 20th century
Afogados da Ingazeira